Adam Brenkus (born 8 January 1999) is a Slovak professional footballer who plays for ViOn Zlaté Moravce as a midfielder.

Club career

MFK Ružomberok
Brenkus made his Fortuna Liga debut for Ružomberok against iClinic Sereď on 21 July 2018, in the premier round of the 2018–19 season. Brenkus replaced Dalibor Takáč in the 77th minute of the match, that concluded as a goal-less tie. By the end of the season Brenkus would make three more league appearances, but always as a substitute. He was in the starting line up of cup fixture against FK Gerlachov.

References

External links
 MFK Ružomberok official profile 
 Futbalnet profile 
  
 

1999 births
Living people
People from Dolný Kubín
Sportspeople from the Žilina Region
Slovak footballers
Slovakia youth international footballers
Slovakia under-21 international footballers
Association football midfielders
MFK Ružomberok players
Partizán Bardejov players
FC ViOn Zlaté Moravce players
Slovak Super Liga players
2. Liga (Slovakia) players